The following is an incomplete list of public schools in the Canadian province of Quebec.

Primary

Dual primary and secondary schools

Secondary

References

External links
Ministère de l'Éducation

 Quebec